Tom and Jerry: The Fast and the Furry is a 2005 American animated action-adventure comedy film featuring the cat-and-mouse duo Tom and Jerry. Produced by Warner Bros. Animation and Turner Entertainment Co., it is the third made-for-video Tom and Jerry film. Alongside Tom and Jerry: Blast Off to Mars (also written and directed by Bill Kopp), the release of the film coincided with the 65th anniversary of the cat-and-mouse team's debut in 1940.

The Fast and the Furry was first released theatrically in selected cities of the United States by Kidtoon Films on September 3, 2005. The film was then released on both VHS (making it the final Tom and Jerry film to be released in that format) and DVD on October 11, 2005, and on Blu-ray on April 5, 2011.

Plot
Tom and Jerry are evicted from their house by Tom's owner after they destroy it during one of their usual chases. Upon seeing an ad for a race/reality show titled the "Fabulous Super Race" (with the grand prize of a luxurious mansion for the winner), Tom and Jerry build their customized vehicles from a nearby junkyard before heading to "Globwobbler Studios" in Hollywood, California, to enter themselves in the race.

The other racers include elderly Grammy and her ferocious pet dog Squirty; dark lord and florist Gorthan the Destroyer of Light; superstar Steed Dirkly; single mother of four children Malory "Soccer Mom" McDoogle; and scientist Dr. Professor, eliminated before the race after antimatter accidentally vaporizes him and his vehicle, leaving Tom and Jerry room to race.

The race begins in Hollywood, where Grammy takes an early lead, but Steed overtakes her late in the leg. Upon the racers arriving at the finish line in Mexico, the head of Globwobbler Studios, J.W., decides to extend the race to the Amazonian jungle due to high public ratings. During the race through the jungle, Tom switches a sign indicating the road the racers should take, hoping to get Jerry eliminated from the race. However, this instead results in the elimination of Soccer Mom as her minivan sinks into quicksand. She then informs Jerry of which path to take, allowing him to continue racing. Steed wins again, while Grammy follows him in second, but J.W. still wants to continue due to the high ratings. Hosts Biff Buzzard and Buzz Blister announce that the next leg of the race will begin in Antarctica and that the racers will have to modify their vehicles for ocean travel.

On the way to Antarctica, Steed's vehicle sinks, causing his elimination before he falls for a mermaid on a small island, who proceeds to feed him to her ravenous offspring. The first contestant to reach Antarctica is Gorthan, also eliminated after Biff and Buzz goads him into licking a metal pole. He is left adrift along with his vehicle on an iceberg as he struggles to free his tongue. As Tom, Jerry, and Grammy arrive, Grammy is eliminated when a whale accidentally swallows her and Squirty, thanks to Tom's machinations. J.W. then notifies the hosts that the racers will have to modify their vehicles again for underwater travel to Australia. While racing underwater, Tom faces several problems. Seals take over his car, and his fish juice spray attracts sharks, ultimately eliminating him when he crashes into a large concrete block and an anchor crushes him.

Upon arriving in Australia, Jerry then continues racing across Australia to Borneo, where the finish line got reassigned. Grammy and Squirty return to the race when the whale spits them out. Tom also returns after Irving rescues him under J.W.'s orders and saws Australia in half to get in the lead.

The next leg of the race involves the racers modifying their vehicles with balloons for air travel to Borneo. During the leg, Tom inadvertently pops all of Grammy's balloons while attempting to attack Jerry, resulting in Grammy's elimination once again when she and Squirty fall to their deaths upon bickering over what they thought was a parachute. J.W. then announces that the true final leg of the race is back to Hollywood, which will involve them traveling back to the finishing point with high-speed jet planes in only five minutes due to the race taking too long. Tom and Jerry proceed anyway and race through several prominent locations in Asia, Europe, the Atlantic, and the U.S., causing massive yet comedic destruction to numerous monuments. Their jets crumble and shatter near the finish line, with both Tom and Jerry ultimately finishing the race in a tie. 

Although they both technically won as they finished the race tied, J.W. claims that, according to the contract, if a tie occurred, a tiebreaker would have to occur through another race. Not wanting to go through the entire ordeal again, Tom and Jerry viciously attack him and seize the mansion's keys before walking away. An angry and disoriented J.W. then declares that Hollywood stands for family entertainment. The pharaoh-like President of Hollywood appears to incinerate J.W. for his inappropriate change of heart, while Irving becomes the new head of Globwobbler Studios. Tom and Jerry share their new mansion peacefully for a brief moment, until Tom's owner shows up and orders Tom to chase Jerry, reigniting their rivalry.

Voice Cast
 Bill Kopp as Tom Cat & Frank
 John DiMaggio as J.W. Globwobbler & Spike the Bulldog
 Charlie Adler as Grammy
 Jeff Bennett as Steed Dirkly & TV Announcer
 Jess Harnell as Buzz Blister & Film Director
 Tom Kenny as Gorthan the Destroyer of Light & Whale
 Tress MacNeille as Mallory "Soccer Mom" McDoogle, Tour Girl, Tom's Owner & Mermaid Monster
 Rob Paulsen as Irving & Dave
 Frank Welker as Seals & Sharks
 Billy West as Biff Buzzard, President of Hollywood & Squirty
 J. Grant Albrecht as Clown-O & Security Guard
 Thom Pinto as Computer Voice & Guard
 Neil Ross as Dr. Professor & Director

Additional Voices (uncredited)
 Vicki Lewis
 Stephen Root
 Charlie Schlatter
 Renna Nightingale
 Dee Bradley Baker as Jerry Mouse

Production
According to Bill Kopp, the film's director and writer (and voice of Tom), the film was conceived and scripted in 2003 alongside Tom and Jerry: Blast Off to Mars, with work on the film's animation taking place between November 2003 and March 2005.

Widescreen
This was the second Tom and Jerry film to be filmed in widescreen and the first one to be filmed in the high-definition format, although the Region 1 DVD and the U.S. version of Boomerang were in full screen (cropping the left and right of the image), though not pan and scan as the camera stays directly in the center of the image. Like other films and television series filmed in high-definition, the monitor the animation team would have worked from would have 16:9 and 4:3 safe areas so that the full screen version would not crop off too much of the important visual elements (such as characters). However, the film is broadcast in widescreen on Cartoon Network in the United States and released in widescreen on the Region A Blu-ray.

Reception
Renee Schonfeld of Common Sense Media gave the film two stars out of four, saying "Unlike some of the wittier spoofs Tom & Jerry have starred in, this one is less clever and more straightforwardly devoted to thrills and spills."

Follow-up film 
Tom and Jerry: Shiver Me Whiskers was released on August 22, 2006.

References

External links 
 
 

2005 films
2000s English-language films
2005 animated films
2005 action comedy films
2005 direct-to-video films
2000s chase films
2000s comedy road movies
2000s buddy comedy films
2000s adventure comedy films
2000s children's comedy films
2000s American animated films
2000s children's animated films
American direct-to-video films
American chase films
American auto racing films
American comedy road movies
American buddy comedy films
American action comedy films
American adventure comedy films
American slapstick comedy films
American children's animated action films
American children's animated adventure films
American children's animated comedy films
Animated films about dogs
Animated films about auto racing
Animated films about revenge
Films about television
Films about competitions
Films directed by Bill Kopp
Films scored by Nathan Wang
Films set in Asia
Films set in Antarctica
Films set in Australia
Films set in Europe
Films set in Mexico
Films set in South America
Films set in England
Films set in jungles
Films set in the United States
Films set in studio lots
Tom and Jerry films
Treasure hunt films
Warner Bros. Animation animated films
Warner Bros. direct-to-video animated films